Faisal A.J. Saudin (born May 14, 1992), known professionally as A.J. Saudin or Saudin, is a Canadian actor, singer, songwriter, and record producer. He is best known for his role as Connor DeLaurier in the long-running teen drama television series Degrassi: The Next Generation.

Acting career
Before finding success on Degrassi, Saudin worked as a child in print work and commercials before landing his first film role as a seven-year-old, working alongside Natalie Cole in The Natalie Cole Story (2000).

He also starred in supporting roles on various TV series, including Da Kink In My Hair (2007–2009). He also hosted several episodes of Open Your Ears, a music-centered show that aired on Canada's YTV channel.

Saudin landed his first lead role in the film Aruba (2006), directed by Oscar-nominated director Hubert Davis. The film premiered at the Sundance Film Festival in January 2006, and then screened at several festivals, including the 2006 Toronto International Film Festival, the 2006 Palm Springs International ShortFest, the 2007 Seattle International Film Festival, and the 2008 Kansas City Jubilee Film Festival.

Saudin starred on the hit Canadian TV series Degrassi: The Next Generation for 6 years (2008–2015), playing Connor DeLaurier, a teenager with Asperger syndrome. Saudin exited in the show in 2015 to begin focusing on his music career.

Music career 
Saudin left Degrassi: The Next Generation in 2015 to begin focusing on his music career, releasing his first single "Sunset" in October 2016. On the social media platform, Twitter, Saudin confirmed he had quit acting permanently to begin working on music. Saudin released his debut EP, "Before I Met You" on April 21, 2017.

On August 25, 2017, Saudin released his second EP titled "A Midsummer's Daydream" on all music streaming platforms. The project contains four tracks, and was executive produced by himself, Emjay and dF.

On September 1, 2017, Saudin made his live performance debut at the iconic Mod Club Theatre in Toronto, Ontario to a sold out crowd.

Filmography

Discography

EPs 
 Before I Met You (2017)
 A Midsummer's Daydream (2017)

References

External links

1992 births
Living people
Black Canadian male actors
Canadian male film actors
Canadian male television actors
Canadian male singer-songwriters
Canadian singer-songwriters
Canadian people of Nigerian descent
Male actors from Ontario
Musicians from Mississauga